Ælfweard is the name of:

Ælfweard of Wessex (902–924), second son of Edward the Elder, according to some sources briefly king of Wessex
Ælfweard of London (died 1044), Bishop of London

English masculine given names
Old English given names